Antonín Dvořák finished the composition of his String Quartet No. 9 in D minor, Op. 34, (B. 75) on 18 December 1877, having probably started it in July of that year.

Background 

The work was composed in the months after the deaths of two of Dvořák's children, Ruzena (died 13 August 1877 at 10 months of age) and Otakar (died 8 September 1877,  years old). It is dedicated to Johannes Brahms: Dvořák had won the Austrian State Prize fellowship prize 3 times in 4 years (1874, 1876, and 1877), and after this third success, Brahms, one of the members of the committee responsible for awarding the stipend, referred Dvořák to his own publisher, Fritz Simrock.

Dvořák revised it in 1879, and Herbert and Truffit suggest that the first performance may have been given by the Quartetto Heller (Giulio Heller and Alberto Castelli (violins), Carlo Coronini (viola), and Carlo Piacezzi (cello)), in Trieste, on 14 December 1881. Šourek, however gives a first performance at a concert of the Musical Section of the Umělecká beseda (Arts Discussion Group) in Prague on 27 February 1882, by Ferdinand Lachner, Petr Mareš, Václav Borecký, and Alois Neruda.

Structure 
The work is composed in four movements:

Footnotes

Notes

References

External links 
 String Quartet No. 9 on a comprehensive Dvořák site antonin-dvorak.cz, accessed 29 May 2018

Dvorak 09
1877 compositions
Compositions in D minor